Iglesia de San Juan may refer to:

 Iglesia de San Juan (Alevia), a church in Asturias, Spain
 Iglesia de San Juan (Amandi), a church in Asturias, Spain
 Iglesia de San Juan (Camoca), a church in Asturias, Spain
 Iglesia de San Juan (Málaga), a church in Málaga, Spain
 Iglesia de San Juan (Ciliergo), a church in Asturias, Spain
 Iglesia de San Juan (Priorio), a church in Asturias, Spain
 Church of San Juan (Salvatierra), Iglesia de San Juan in Spanish